See How We Are is the sixth studio album by American rock band X, released in 1987 by Elektra Records. It was their first album without founding guitarist Billy Zoom, who was replaced by ex-Blasters guitarist Dave Alvin for the album's recording sessions and some live shows. Alvin left X on good terms and was replaced by Tony Gilkyson.

It was reissued with five bonus tracks by Rhino in 2002.

"4th of July" appeared on the TV show The Sopranos, where it was played in the end credits to the 2006 episode "Live Free or Die".

Critical reception 

Robert Christgau gave the album a lukewarm review in his 1987 "Consumer Guide" column for The Village Voice:

Track listing
All tracks written by Exene Cervenka and John Doe except as indicated.

Side 1
 "I'm Lost" – 2:55
 "You" – 3:28
 "4th of July" (Dave Alvin) – 3:32
 "In the Time It Takes" – 3:09
 "Anyone Can Fill Your Shoes" – 2:45
 "See How We Are" – 3:46

Side 2
 "Left & Right" – 2:57
 "When It Rains..." – 4:29
 "Holiday Story" – 3:36
 "Surprise, Surprise" – 2:50
 "Cyrano de Berger's Back" (John Doe) – 3:33

Bonus tracks (2002 reissue)
 "Holiday Story" (Demo/Remix) – 4:00
 "I'm Lost" (Demo/Remix) – 2:48
 "Highway 61 Revisited" (Bob Dylan) (Outtake/Rough Mix) – 5:08
 "In the Time It Takes" (Demo/Remix) – 3:08
 "See How We Are" (Demo/Remix) – 3:57
 (untitled hidden track) – 2:06

Personnel
X
D.J. Bonebrake – drums, percussion
Exene Cervenka – vocals
Tony Gilkyson – guitars
John Doe – vocals, bass
Additional personnel
Dave Alvin – guitar, six-string bass
Benmont Tench – Hammond organ, Casiotone

Charts

References

X (American band) albums
1987 albums
Elektra Records albums